HonestBrew was a United Kingdom-based online craft beer retailer. The company delivered beers direct to customers across the U.K. and Europe, as well as supplying offices. They organised their own events, took part in industry-wide festivals and actively launched and promoted new breweries.

History 
HonestBrew was launched in 2014 by four friends (three from New Zealand and one from Australia) in Andrew Reeve's London apartment.

The business, was bootstrapped using £30,000 of the founders own money and also received an initial cash injection from the government's Start Up Loans initiative, it also raised £250,000 from leading food Industry experts  and over £400,000 on the crowd funding platform Crowdcube.

In 2016, Startups.co.uk named HonestBrew number 49 on their annual list of the UK's leading Startups. HonestBrew also won the Startups Retail Business of the Year Award in 2015.

The company ceased trading on 14 June 2022 and appointed liquidators on 17 June 2022.

See also
 Microbrewery
 Beer in the United Kingdom

References

External links
 Official website

Companies based in the London Borough of Islington
Catering and food service companies of the United Kingdom
Beer in England
British companies established in 2014
Food and drink companies established in 2014